Nambale Constituency is an electoral constituency in Kenya. It is one of seven constituencies in Busia County. The constituency was established for the 1988 elections.

Members of Parliament 

Kenya general election 2017    John Sakwa Bunyasi      Amani National Congress

Wards

References 

Constituencies in Busia County
Constituencies of Western Province (Kenya)
1988 establishments in Kenya
Constituencies established in 1988